Holy water is water that has been blessed by a member of the clergy or a religious figure, or derived from a well or spring considered holy. The use for cleansing prior to a baptism and spiritual cleansing is common in several religions, from Christianity to Sikhism. The use of holy water as a sacramental for protection against evil is common among Lutherans, Anglicans, Roman Catholics, and Eastern Christians.

In Christianity 

In Catholicism, Lutheranism, Anglicanism, Eastern Orthodoxy, Oriental Orthodoxy and some other churches, holy water is water that has been sanctified by a priest for the purpose of baptism, for the blessing of persons, places, and objects, or as a means of repelling evil.

History 
The Apostolic Constitutions, whose texts date to about the year 400 AD, attribute the precept of using holy water to the Apostle Matthew. It is plausible that the earliest Christians may have used water for  expiatory and  purificatory purposes in a way analogous to its employment in Jewish Law ("And he shall take holy water in an earthen vessel, and he shall cast a little earth of the pavement of the tabernacle into it", Numbers 5:17). Yet in many cases, the water used for the sacrament of Baptism was flowing water, sea- or river-water, which — in the view of the Catholic Church — could not receive the same blessing as that water contained in the baptisteries. However, Eastern Orthodox Christians do perform the same blessing, whether in a baptistery or for an outdoor body of water.

Use and storage 

Sprinkling with holy water is used as a sacramental that recalls baptism. In the West the blessing of the water is traditionally accompanied by exorcism and by the addition of exorcised and blessed salt.

Holy water is kept in the holy water font, which is typically located at the entrance to the church (or sometimes in a separate room or building called a baptistery). Smaller vessels, called stoups, are usually placed at the entrances of the church, to enable people to bless themselves with it on entering. 

In the Middle Ages Christians esteemed the power of holy water so highly that in some places fonts had locked covers to prevent the theft of holy water for unauthorized magic practices. The Constitutions of  Archbishop Edmund Rich (1236) prescribe that: "Fonts are to be kept under lock and key, because of witchcraft (sortilege). Similarly the chrism and sacred oil are kept locked up."

Proper disposal 

In Catholicism, holy water, as well as water used during the washing of the priest's hands at Mass, is not allowed to be disposed of in regular plumbing. Roman Catholic churches will usually have a special basin (a ) that leads directly into the ground for the purpose of proper disposal. A hinged lid is kept over the holy water basin to distinguish it from a regular sink basin, which is often just beside it. Items that contained holy water are separated, drained of the holy water, and then washed in a regular manner in the adjacent sink.

Hygiene 
Holy water fonts have been identified as a potential source of bacterial and viral infection. In the late-19th century, bacteriologists found staphylococci, streptococci,  coli bacilli, Loeffler's bacillus, and other bacteria in samples of holy water taken from a church in Sassari, Italy. In a study performed in 1995, 13 samples were taken when a burn patient acquired a bacterial infection after exposure to holy water. The samples in that study were shown to have a "wide range of bacterial species", some of which could cause infection in humans. During the swine-flu epidemic of 2009, Bishop John Steinbock of Fresno, California, recommended that "holy water should not be in the fonts" for fear of spreading infections. Also in response to the swine flu, an automatic, motion-detecting holy-water dispenser was invented and installed in an Italian church in 2009. In 2020, because of the COVID-19 pandemic, Episcopal Conferences directed that holy water be removed from the fonts or stoups.

Christian traditions

Roman Catholics

Sacramental and sanctification 

A blessing, as a prayer, is a sacramental. By blessing water, Catholic priests praise God and ask him for his grace. As a reminder of baptism, Catholic Christians dip their fingers in holy water and make the sign of the cross when entering a church.

Fr. John F. Sullivan, writing in the early twentieth century, noted that, "Besides the pouring of baptismal water ... the sprinkling with holy water is a part of the ceremonies of Matrimony, of Extreme Unction and of the administration of the Holy Eucharist to the sick, and it is employed also in  services for the dead."

The Sunday liturgy may begin with the Rite of Blessing and Sprinkling Holy Water, in which holy water is sprinkled upon the congregation; this is called "aspersion" (from the Latin, "to sprinkle"). This ceremony dates back to the 9th century. An "aspergill" or aspergillum is a brush or branch used to sprinkle the water. Blessed salt may be added to the water where it is customary to do so.

The Catholic Church teaches this use of holy water and making a sign of the cross when entering a church reflects a renewal of baptism, a cleansing of venial sin, as well as providing protection against evil. It is sometimes accompanied by the following prayer:

Some Catholics believe that water from specific shrines (such as Lourdes) can bring healing - although that water is not the same as typical holy water found in parishes, since it has not been blessed by a priest.

Formula 
The traditional Latin formula for blessing the water is as follows:

A priest may choose from three other formulae found in the Book of Blessings for blessing water. They are to be accompanied by the priest blessing the water with the sign of the cross. They are as follows:

V. Blessed are you, Lord, all-powerful God, who in Christ, the living water of salvation, blessed and transformed us. Grant that when we are sprinkled with this water or make use of it, we will be refreshed inwardly by the power of the Holy Spirit and continue to walk in the new life we received at Baptism. We ask this though Christ our Lord. R. Amen.

V. Lord, holy Father, look with kindness on your children redeemed by your Son and born to a new life by water and the Holy Spirit. Grant that those who are sprinkled with this water may be renewed in body and spirit and may make a pure offering of their service to you. We ask this through Christ our Lord. R. Amen.

V. O God, the Creator of all things, by water and the Holy Spirit you have given the universe its beauty and fashioned us in your own image. R. Bless and purify your Church. V. O Christ the Lord, from your pierced side you gave us your sacraments as fountains of salvation. R. Bless and purify your Church. V. Priest: O Holy Spirit, giver of life, from the baptismal font of the Church you have formed us into a new creation in the waters of rebirth. R. Bless and purify your Church.

Protection against evil 

In his book The Externals of the Catholic Church, originally published in 1917, Fr. John F. Sullivan writes:  "The prayers said over the water are addressed to the Father, the Son, and the Holy Ghost, that through the power of the Blessed Trinity the spirits of evil may be utterly expelled from this world and lose all influence over mankind. Then God is besought to bless the water, that it may be effective in driving out devils and in curing diseases; that wherever it is sprinkled there may be freedom from pestilence and from the snares of Satan."

Catholic saints have written about the power of holy water as a force that repels evil. Saint Teresa of Avila (1515-1582), a Doctor of the Church who reported visions of Jesus and Mary, believed fervently in the power of holy water and stated that she used it with success to repel evil and temptations. She wrote:

The 20th-century nun and mystic Saint Faustina in her diary (paragraph 601) said she once sprinkled a dying sister with holy water to drive away demons. Although this was wrong to do, since it was the priest's duty, she remarked, "holy water is indeed of great help to the dying".

In Holy Water and Its Significance for Catholics, Cistercian priest Henry Theiler states that in addition to being a strong force in repelling evil, holy water has the twofold benefit of providing grace for both body and soul.

The new  excludes the exorcism prayer on the water. Exorcised and blessed salt has traditionally been added to the holy water as well.

Eastern Christians 

Among the  Eastern Orthodox and the Byzantine Rite  Catholics, holy water is used frequently in rites of blessing and exorcism, and the water for baptism is always sanctified with a special blessing.

There are two rites for blessing holy water: the "Great Blessing of Waters", which is held on the Feast of Theophany and at baptisms, and the "Lesser Blessing of Waters" which is conducted according to need and local custom during the rest of the year, certain feast days calling for the Lesser Blessing of Waters as part of their liturgical observance. Both forms are based upon the Rite of Baptism. After the blessing of holy water the faithful are sprinkled with it and each drinks some of it.

Holy water is drunk by the faithful after it is blessed and it is a common custom for the pious to drink holy water every morning. In the monasteries of Mount Athos holy water is always drunk in conjunction with consuming antidoron. Eastern Orthodox do not typically bless themselves with holy water upon entering a church as Western Catholics do, but a quantity of holy water is often kept in a  font placed in the narthex (entrance) of the church, available for anyone who would like to partake of it or to take some of it home.

After the annual Great Blessing of Waters at  Theophany (also known as  Epiphany), the priest goes to the homes of the faithful within his parish and, in predominantly Orthodox lands, to the buildings throughout town, and blesses them with holy water.

When blessing objects such as the palms on Palm Sunday,  Paschal eggs and other foods for Easter, candles, or liturgical instruments and sacred vessels (at least in some traditions, such as in that of the Georgian Orthodox Church, icons and crosses must also be blessed, as they are not considered intrinsically holy and redeemed), the blessing is completed by a triple sprinkling with holy water using the words, "This (name of item) is blessed by the sprinkling of this holy water, in the name of the Father, and of the Son, and of the Holy Spirit."

Throughout the centuries, members of the Orthodox Church have believed many springs of water to be miraculous. Some still flow, such as the one at Pochaev Lavra in Ukraine, and the Life-Giving Spring of the Theotokos in Constantinople (commemorated on Bright Friday).

Anglicans 

Although "Holy water" is not a term used in official rites of the Church of England, font water is sanctified in the Church of England baptism rite. In contrast, the Episcopal Church (United States) does expressly mention the optional use of holy water in some recent liturgies of blessing. More generally, the use of water within High Church Anglicanism or Anglo-Catholicism adheres closely to Roman Catholic practice. In many Anglican churches baptismal water is used for the asperges. A widely-used Anglo-Catholic manual, Ritual Notes, first published by A. R. Mowbray in 1894, discusses the blessing and use of holy water. In addition to "the pious custom" of blessing oneself on entering and leaving a church "in memory of our baptism and in token of the purity of heart with which we should worship Almighty God", the book commends that "Holy water should be obtained from the parish priest, may be (and indeed should be) taken away and kept for use privately by the faithful in their homes." An English translation of the traditional rite for the blessing of water and  salt, including the exorcisms, was included in the Anglican Missal. Shorter forms are found in A Priest's Handbook by Dennis G. Michno, and Ceremonies of the Eucharist by Howard E. Galley. Some parishes use a stoup, basin, or font to make holy water available for the faithful to use in blessing themselves, making the sign of the cross upon entering the church.

In the Book of Occasional Services of the Episcopal Church (United States), in the rite for Restoring of Things Profaned, the bishop or priest while processing around the church or chapel recites Psalm 118 with the antiphon :

A rubric directs that as each profaned object is addressed, "it may be symbolically cleansed by the use of signs of purification, such as water or incense."

Ethiopian Orthodox Tewahedo Church 

Holy water is important to the Ethiopian Orthodox Tewahedo Church and regarded as  healing from demonic possession and for treating sick people, particularly in cases of mental illness. It can be consumed or poured over someone supposed to be afflicted by harmful things.  A majority of studies show that many Ethiopians prefer holy water for biomedical purposes, especially for treatment of  HIV AIDS. Pilgrims visit different monasteries such as Tsadkane Mariam and Entoto Kidane Mehret to acquire holy water. 

Besides, holy water also used for Ethiopian Orthodox holidays such as Timkat (Epiphany) where Christians gather at notable squares and churches and priests bless holy water and spatter them. In Gondar, the Fasilides Bath is used to bathe and represents the Jordan River.

Lutherans 

The use of holy water in some synods of Lutheranism is for the baptism of infants and new members of the church. The water is believed to be blessed by God, as it is used in a sacrament. The water is applied to the forehead of the laity being baptised and the minister performs the sign of the cross. Lutherans tend to have baptismal water fonts near the entrance of the church.

Other synods do not use holy water, however they do typically treat the water used for baptisms in a  respectful manner.

Methodists 
In the Methodist tradition, Holy Baptism is often administered by sprinkling or pouring holy water over the candidate. The official Baptismal Liturgy, as well as the liturgy for Reaffirmation of Baptism commonly done through asperges, has a prayer for the blessing of this water:

Other religions

Sikhism 

One of the holiest sites in Sikhism, Harmandir Sahib, is surrounded by a pool of water called amritsar or amritsarovar. For those who wish to take a dip in the pool, the Temple provides a half hexagonal shelter and holy steps to Har ki Pauri. Bathing in the pool is believed by many Sikhs to have restorative powers, purifying one's karma. Some carry bottles of the pool water home particularly for sick friends and relatives. The pool is maintained by volunteers who perform kar seva (community service) by draining and desilting it periodically.

Sikhs use the Punjabi term amrita (ਅੰਮ੍ਰਿਤ) for the holy water used in the baptism ceremony known as Amrit Sanskar or Amrit Chhakhna.

Hinduism 

In Hinduism, water represents God in a spiritual sense which is the central theme in Mantra Pushpam from Taithreeya Aranyakam of Yajur Veda. Bathing in holy water is, thus, a key element in Hinduism, and the Ganges is considered the holiest Hindu river. Holy water in Hinduism is thought to purify the soul and combat evil. Some Hindus use holy water to wash hands before ringing a bell.

Buddhism 
The idea of "blessed water" is used in virtually all Buddhist traditions. In the Theravada tradition, water is put into a new pot and kept near a Paritrana ceremony, a blessing for protection. This "lustral water" can be created in a ceremony in which the burning and extinction of a candle above the water represents the elements of earth, fire, and air. This water is later given to the people to be kept in their home. Not only water but also oil and strings are blessed in this ceremony. Most Mahayana Buddhists typically recite sutras or various mantras (typically that of the bodhisattva Avalokitesvara for example) numerous times over the water, which is then either consumed or is used to bless homes afterwards. In Vajrayana Buddhism, a Bumpa, a ritual object, is one of the Ashtamangala, used for storing sacred water sometimes, symbolizing wisdom and long life.

Islam 

The Muslim variety of holy water is the Zamzam water that comes from a spring near the Kaaba in Mecca.

The drinking of "healing water" (āb-i shifā) is a practice in various denominations of Shia Islam. In the tradition of the Twelver Shi’a, many dissolve the dust of sacred locations such as Karbala (khāk-i shifa) and Najaf and drink the water (āb-i shifā) as a cure for illness, both spiritual and physical.

The Ismaili tradition involves the practice of drinking water blessed by the Imam of the time. This water is taken in the name of the Imam and has a deep spiritual significance. This is evident from the names used to designate the water, including light (nūr) and ambrosia (amṛt, amī, amīras, amījal). This practice is recorded from the 13th and 14th centuries and continues to the present day. The ceremony is known as ghat-pat in South Asia.

Mandaeism 
In Mandaeism, mambuha, sometimes spelled mambuga, is sacramental drinking water used in rituals such as the masbuta (baptism), while halalta is sacramental rinsing water used in rituals such as the masiqta (death mass).

Others 
In Ancient Greek religion, holy water called chernips was created when a torch from a religious shrine was extinguished in it. In Greek religion, purifying people and locations with water was part of the process of distinguishing the sacred from the profane.

In Wicca and other ceremonial magic traditions, a bowl of salt is blessed and a small amount is stirred into a bowl of water that has been ritually purified. In some traditions of Wicca, this mixture of water and salt symbolizes the brine of the sea, which is regarded as the womb of the Goddess, and the source of all life on Earth. The mixture is consecrated and used in many religious ceremonies and magical rituals.

Unofficial uses 

Holy water has also been believed to ward off or act as a weapon against mythical evil creatures, such as vampires. In eastern Europe, one might sprinkle holy water onto the corpse of a suspected vampire in order to destroy it or render it inert. Thereafter, the concept proliferated into fiction about such creatures.

Gallery 
Stoups

See also

References

Further reading
 (Mother) Mary; Ware, (Archimandrite) Kallistos (Tr.)(1998). The Festal Menaion (reprint), pp 348–359. South Canaan: St. Tikhon's Seminary Press. .
 Isabel Florence Hapgood (Tr., ed.)(1983). Service Book of the Holy Orthodox-Catholic Apostolic Church (6th ed.), pp 189–197. Englewood: Antiochian Orthodox Christian Archdiocese.
 Collectio Rituum ad instar appendicis Ritualis Romani pro dioecesibus Statuum Foederatorum Americae Septentrionalis. Milwaukee: Bruce (1954)

External links 
 On Holy Water blessed at Theophany by St. John of Shanghai and San Francisco (Eastern Orthodox)
 Holy Water from various Churches
 Photo of Great Blessing of Waters at Theophany (Russian Orthodox)
 Photo of Lesser Blessing of Waters (Russian Orthodox)
 St Brigid's Well, County Kildare

Anglican liturgy
Water
Catholic liturgy
Christian religious objects
Lutheran sacraments and rites
Eastern Christian liturgical objects
Religious practices
Religious objects
Water
Water and religion
Christian terminology
Objects believed to protect from evil